Shung Ching San Tsuen is a village in the Shap Pat Heung area of Yuen Long District, Hong Kong.

Administration
Shung Ching San Tsuen is a recognized village under the New Territories Small House Policy.

Education
Shung Ching San Tsuen is divided between Primary One Admission (POA) School Net 73 and POA School Net 74. Within POA 73 are multiple aided schools (operated independently but funded with government money) and one government school: South Yuen Long Government Primary School (南元朗官立小學). POA 74 has multiple aided schools and one government school: Yuen Long Government Primary School (元朗官立小學).

References

External links

 Delineation of area of existing village Shung Ching San Tsuen (I) (Shap Pat Heung) for election of resident representative (2019 to 2022)
 Delineation of area of existing village Shung Ching San Tsuen (II) (Shap Pat Heung) for election of resident representative (2019 to 2022)

Villages in Yuen Long District, Hong Kong
Shap Pat Heung